R316 road may refer to:
 R316 road (Ireland)
 R316 road (South Africa)